Curtis Murphy (born December 3, 1975) is a Canadian former professional ice hockey defenceman.

Career
Murphy was signed as an undrafted free agent by the Minnesota Wild in on June 18, 2001, and he played one game in the National Hockey League with the Wild in the 2002–03 season.

Murphy was a member of Team Canada at the 2007 Spengler Cup. He has won two American Hockey League Calder Cups, one in 2003 with the Houston Aeros and one in 2004 with the Milwaukee Admirals.

Murphy moved to Europe in 2007, signing for SC Langnau in the Swiss Nationalliga A. In 2011, he moved to the Erste Bank Eishockey Liga in Austria and signed for EHC Black Wings Linz.

Career statistics

Awards and honours

References

External links

1975 births
Canadian ice hockey defencemen
Canadian people of Irish descent
EHC Black Wings Linz players
Houston Aeros (1994–2013) players
Ice hockey people from Saskatchewan
Living people
Lokomotiv Yaroslavl players
Milwaukee Admirals players
Minnesota Wild players
Nipawin Hawks players
North Dakota Fighting Hawks men's ice hockey players
Orlando Solar Bears (IHL) players
SCL Tigers players
Undrafted National Hockey League players
Canadian expatriate ice hockey players in Austria
Canadian expatriate ice hockey players in Russia
Canadian expatriate ice hockey players in Switzerland
NCAA men's ice hockey national champions
AHCA Division I men's ice hockey All-Americans